Nicola L. (born Nicola Leuthe, 1932–2018) was a visual artist who developed a multidisciplinary practice that playfully merged the principles of art and design. Born in Morocco to French parents, the artist was initially associated with Pop Art and went on to work across five decades, creating interactive sculptures, radical performances, and collage-like paintings, as well as films and plays. Responsive to the counter-cultural movements that originally framed her practice, Nicola L.'s expansive body of work was united through an engagement with feminist politics, and the ideals of equality and collectivity. The artist became particularly known for her witty, anthropomorphic sculptures that fused female bodies and domestic objects, materializing the objectification of women. The artist described her work as "an ephemeral monument to freedom."

Career
Nicola L.'s interest in art led her to Paris in 1954, where she studied abstract painting at the École nationale supérieure des Beaux-Arts, mentored by the painter Jean Souverbie who encouraged her to "cut the body up in the same way that light was cutting the live model". During this period she became friends with the critic Pierre Restany, and met Fred Lanzenberg, whom she married in 1956. Lanzenberg later opened an art gallery in Brussels in 1966, initially collaborating with the influential dealer Ileana Sonnabend on exhibitions of American Pop artists. During her studies, Nicola L. became aware first-hand of the prejudice faced by female artists and stopped using her surname, later adding the initial 'L' in the 2000s.

The beginning of the 1960s was a transformative moment for Nicola L. The artist became close to the French New Realist group, which advocated that art should comment on society using existing objects and materials. Instigated by Restany, the movement also included Yves Klein, Jean Tinguely, Christo and Niki de Saint Phalle. In 1964, now working between Paris and Ibiza, Nicola L. met the conceptual Argentine artist Alberto Greco. Having recently returned from New York, where he had encountered Marcel Duchamp, Greco repeatedly questioned Nicola L.'s pursuit of painting. "I burned all of my abstract paintings and made The Screen for Three People: Homage to Alberto Greco," she later reflected. "This marked the beginning of a new and totally different body of work for me, inspired by skin, which Pierre Restany called Pénétrables." These hybrid forms consisted of rectangles of stretched canvas into which viewers could insert their arms, legs or heads, becoming literally at one with art. They would often allow for multiple participants, who would appear together as a single organism. One of her most iconic works from Pénétrables, an eleven-person garment titled Red Coat (1969), was first activated in a historic performance at the Isle of Wight festival in 1970, with musicians Caetano Veloso and Gilberto Gil, members of the Neo-concrete movement in Brazil. "At the end of the performance we were distributing gloves on which was written 'same skin for everybody', and people started chanting the phrase."

Although the artist's work made reference to both male and female bodies, the nude feminine form became a recurring motif, as it was for counterparts in her circle such as Carolee Schneemann, Valie Export, Rosalyn Drexler and Marisol. Terming much of her sculpture "functional art," Nicola L. made objects akin to furniture that were based on the artist tracing real bodies, exaggerating and over-simplifying their contours. In La Femme Commode (1969 - 2014) lacquered wood cabinets are arranged in the shape of a body, in which eyes, mouths and breasts become drawers. The artist's 1969 sculpture Little TV Woman: 'I Am the Last Woman Object' takes the form of an oversized female form with a television monitor for a stomach, which periodically displays a message: "I am the last woman object. You can take my lips, touch my breasts, caress my stomach, my sex. But I repeat it, it is the last time." The soft, pliable forms in The Giant Foot (1967) and White Foot Sofa (1968) - works that were meant to be opened up and sat upon - marked the artist's first experiments with vinyl, a fabric that transformed her practice.

In 1975, Nicola L. began to concentrate on film projects. In 1977, she directed the feature film Les Têtes sont Encore Dans L'île (The Heads are Still in the Island) with Terry Thomas and Pierral, shot in Ibiza. In 1979, Nicola L. moved to New York, where she continued to focus on film-making. Her first documentary captured the punk-rock band Bad Brains at the Lower East Side nightclub CBGB. It was followed by a 1981 documentary about activist Abbie Hoffman. The artist's final film was Doors Ajar at the Chelsea Hotel (2011), where she had lived for nearly three decades.

In the 1990s, Nicola L. returned to feminism through series of paintings and works on paper. For Poems by Dorothy Parker (1994), she created collages on wood that included a snail form along with a snippet of a poem. The Femme Fatale paintings (1995), made from painted bed sheets accompanied by images and texts, explored women who had died tragic or violent deaths, among them Marilyn Monroe, Billie Holiday and Ulrike Meinhof.

Towards the end of her life, the artist continued to develop her Penetrables series, with several public performances, including The Blue Cape, which premiered in Cuba in 2002, followed by performances on the Great Wall of China (2005) and the Venice Biennale (2016). The artist's Red Coat was most recently performed in London on the occasion of the work's display at Tate Modern in 2015.

Nicola L.'s work has been acquired by international collections including Centre Pompidou, Paris;  FRAC Bretagne, France; Gallery of Modern Art, Glasgow; Musée d'Arts Plastiques, Brussels; Museum of Contemporary Art, Antwerp; and MAMCO, Geneva

References

External links 
 Nicola L. : Works, 1968 to the Present, Retrospective, SculptureCenter, New York
 The World Goes Pop, Tate Modern, London - Artist biographies: Nicola L.''

Nouveau réalisme
French conceptual artists
French video artists
French performance artists
Pop artists
French women sculptors
20th-century French sculptors
20th-century French women artists
21st-century French sculptors
21st-century French women artists
1932 births
2018 deaths
People from El Jadida
French contemporary artists
Moroccan contemporary artists